Hank Thompson may refer to:

Hank Thompson (baseball) (1925–1969), American third baseman
Hank Thompson (musician) (1925–2007), country music singer and songwriter

See also
Henry Thompson (disambiguation)